John "Jack" Woollard (18 May 1880 – 18 July 1965) was an Australian rules footballer who played at eight clubs across the South Australian Football League, West Australian Football League and Goldfields Football League.

Early football 
John Woollard played his junior years at the Brighton Football Club in Adelaide.

Senior football career (1898–1910)

West Adelaide (1898–1900)

Sturt (1901) 
John Woollard made his debut with Sturt at the same time as the club made its debut in the SAFA.

West Torrens (1902)

West Perth (1903)

Mines Rovers (1904) 
During his year at Mines Rovers would lose the Gold Fields premiership to Railways by 3 points.

Kalgoorlie City (1905) 
In reviewing a game between Kalgoorlie and Boulder the Kalgoorlie Miner said that "The Boulder had no man in their team to compare in point, of brilliance with Woollard".

East Perth (1906) 
John Woollard was the first captain of East Perth when it was promoted to the WAFL in 1906.

Sturt (1907) 
John Woollard made a return to Sturt for a season in 1907.

Port Adelaide (1908–1910) 
John Woollard joined Port Adelaide in 1908. He would become captain in 1910 and lead the club to the 1910 SAFL premiership, the first of his career. In the pose season of 1910 Jack Woollard would captain the club to victories over East Fremantle, premiers of Western Australia and Collingwood, premiers of Victoria.

Woollard joined Port Adelaide on its trip to Tasmania in 1912.

Reputation 
When Angelo Congear was asked who was the best skipper he has played under, without hesitation he nominated Jack Woollard. "Jack", he said,"always had things well organised, and one played under his guidance with every confidence."

See also
 1908 Melbourne Carnival

References 

1880 births
1965 deaths
Australian rules footballers from South Australia
Sturt Football Club players
West Torrens Football Club players
West Adelaide Football Club players
Port Adelaide Football Club (SANFL) players
Port Adelaide Football Club players (all competitions)
Port Adelaide Football Club (SANFL) coaches
West Perth Football Club players
East Perth Football Club players
Kalgoorlie City Football Club players
Mines Rovers Football Club players